The vice president of Palau is the second-highest position in the executive branch of the government of Palau, after the president.

List of vice presidents

See also
President of Palau
List of current vice presidents

References

Palau
Government of Palau
Palau, Vice-Presidents of
Vice President
 
1980 establishments in Palau